Sagaing Township is a township in Sagaing District in the Sagaing Division of Myanmar. The principal town is Sagaing and tourist spot of Mingun.

Ye Kharr lake between Sagaing Hill and Min Wun Hill produces natural spirulina as in Twintaung of Budalin Township and Twinma and Taung Pauk of Kani Township.

Demographics

2014

The 2014 Myanmar Census reported that Sagaing Township had a population of 307,194. The population density was 244.5 people per km². The census reported that the median age was 30.1 years, and 88 males per 100 females. There were 65,143 households; the mean household size was 4.3.

See also
Sadaung

References

External links
Maplandia World Gazetteer - map showing the township boundary

 
Townships of Sagaing Region